USS Batfish (SSN-681), a , was the second ship of the United States Navy to be named for the batfish.

Construction and commissioning
The contract to build Batfish was awarded to the Electric Boat Division of General Dynamics Corporation in Groton, Connecticut, on 25 June 1968 and her keel was laid down there on 9 February 1970. She was launched on 9 October 1971, sponsored by Mrs. Arthur R. Gralla, and commissioned on 1 September 1972.

Service history

1972-1978
After commissioning, Batfish was assigned  Naval Station Charleston at Charleston, South Carolina, as her home port.

On 22 January 1973 Batfish ran hard aground at Charleston while proceeding to sea. She was pulled free by tugs and returned to port where extensive damage to her bottom was repaired.

Operation Evening Star, 1978 
On 2 March 1978, Batfish, commanded by Commander (later Rear Admiral) Thomas Evans, left Charleston on what would transpire to be a remarkable 77-day patrol known as "Operation Evening Star". Batfish began trailing the boat, collecting valuable information on how the Soviet Navy operated. During the next 50 days, the Yankee I never detected Batfish. Batfish only lost contact with the boat twice, the first time during a bad storm, and the second time when a fishing fleet passed overhead. Both times, Batfish quickly reacquired the Soviet submarine.

The Soviets remained unaware that their submarine had been followed by any vessel until U.S. Navy Chief Warrant Officer John Anthony Walker reported the incident to them while he was spying in the 1980s. Walker pleaded guilty to espionage in 1985.

1978-1999

Batfish conducted a deployment in the Mediterranean Sea with the United States Sixth Fleet from February to August 1992.

In September 1994 Batfish was transferred from her homeport in Charleston, SC to Naval Submarine Base New London at Groton, CT, which remained her home port for the rest of her operational life.

Batfish conducted a deployment in the Mediterranean Sea with the Sixth Fleet as part of the  carrier battle group from March to September 1995.
Batfish conducted a deployment in 1996, transiting through the Panama canal and into the Pacific for a 4-week excursion in the Southern hemisphere and Central Pacific.

Final disposition
Batfish was decommissioned on 17 March 1999 and stricken from the Naval Vessel Register the same day. Her scrapping via the Nuclear-Powered Ship and Submarine Recycling Program at Puget Sound Naval Shipyard in Bremerton, Washington, was completed on 22 November 2002.

Notes

References

NavSource Online: Submarine Photo Archive Batfish (SSN-681)
 "Voyage of the Batfish: 50 days tailing Soviet sub" by Pauline Jelinek, The Seattle Times, 2 March 2001

External links

 

Ships built in Groton, Connecticut
Sturgeon-class submarines
Cold War submarines of the United States
United States submarine accidents
Maritime incidents in 1973
Nuclear submarines of the United States Navy
1971 ships